Compsoptera is a genus of moths in the family Geometridae.

Species
 Compsoptera argentaria (Herrich-Schäffer, 1839)
 Compsoptera caesaraugustanus Redondo, 1995
 Compsoptera jourdanaria (Serres, 1826)
 Compsoptera opacaria (Hübner, 1819)

References
 Compsoptera at Markku Savela's Lepidoptera and Some Other Life Forms
 Natural History Museum Lepidoptera genus database

Ennominae
Geometridae genera